Eta Mensae, Latinized from η Mensae, is the Bayer designation for a solitary, orange-hued star in the southern constellation of Mensa. This object has an apparent visual magnitude of 5.47, which is sufficiently luminous to be faintly visible to the naked eye. Based upon an annual parallax shift of 4.88 mas as seen from Earth, this star is located roughly 670 light years from the Sun.

This is an evolved K-type giant star with a stellar classification of K4 III. It is radiating 616 times the Sun's luminosity from its photosphere at an effective temperature of 4,055 K. The star displays an infrared excess that suggests the presence of circumstellar dust. Eta Mensae is a probable member of the stream of stars associated with the Hyades cluster.

References

K-type giants
Circumstellar disks
Mensa (constellation)
Mensae, Eta
Durchmusterung objects
032440
1629
022871